Historic Monument is one of several categories of objects of cultural heritage (in the singular, zabytek) in Poland.

To be recognized as a Polish historic monument, an object must be declared such by the President of Poland. The term "historic monument" was introduced into Polish  law in 1990, and the first Historic Monuments were declared by President Lech Wałęsa in 1994.

List
The National Heritage Board of Poland maintains the official list.

References

Objects of cultural heritage in Poland
Law of Poland